Zikanita argenteofasciata is a species of longhorn beetle in the family Cerambycidae, the subfamily Lamiinae, in the tribe Acanthocerini. It was described by Tippmann in 1960. The insect is local to Peru.

References

Acanthoderini
Beetles described in 1960